Borkana River is a river of central Ethiopia. Johann Ludwig Krapf records that it was called "Tshaffa" by the local Oromo people.

See also 
 Rivers of Ethiopia

References 

Awash River
Rivers of Ethiopia